Glamorous Temptation is a 2015 South Korean television series starring Joo Sang-wook, Choi Kang-hee, and Cha Ye-ryun. It replaced Splendid Politics and aired on MBC on Mondays and Tuesdays at 22:00 (KST) for 50 episodes from October 5, 2015 to March 22, 2016.

Plot
The series follow three characters: an ambitious woman, a woman jealous of her, and a man who will take revenge.

Cast

Main cast
Joo Sang-wook as Jin Hyeong-woo
Nam Joo-hyuk as young Jin Hyeong-woo 
Hyeong-woo is a man who lives for revenge, as he vows to take revenge against those who drove his father to death when he was still a teenager.

Choi Kang-hee as Shin Eun-soo
Kim Sae-ron as young Shin Eun-soo. 
Despite facing a cruel fate, where she is framed for crimes she did not commit and left a widow after her husband dies at a young age, Eun-soo proves to be a strong woman as she strives on to be a good single mother to her young daughter.

Cha Ye-ryun as Kang Il-joo
 Kim Bo-ra as young Kang Il-joo 
Initially known by the name Sang-yi, Il-joo was born to her father's mistress. After her foster mother's death, II-joo is brought under the care of Hyeong-woo's family, who raise her as a close relative. She falls in love with Hyeong-woo, but gets extremely jealous when her close friend Eun-soo and Hyeong-woo fall for each other. She eventually takes matters into her own hands, betraying her friend and eventually rises up as a presidential candidate.

Supporting cast

Hyeong-woo's Family
Kim Byung-se as Hyeong-woo's father
Na Young-hee as Hyeong-woo's mother

Eun-soo's Family
Jung In-gi as Eun-soo's father
Kim Mi-kyung as Eun-soo's mother
Dong Ha as Shin Bum-Soo, Eun-soo's brother
Kim Hyung-kyu as young Shin Bum-Soo
Lee Jae-yoon as Hong Myung-Ho, Eun-soo's husband
Kal So-won as Hong Mi-Rae, Eun-soo's daughter

Il-Joo's Family
Jung Jin-young as Kang Seok-hyun, Il-Joo's father
Kim Pub-lae as Kang Il-Do, Il-Joo's elder brother
Park Jung-ah as Lee See-young, Il-Do's wife
Jang Young-nam as Kang Il-Ran, Il-Joo's elder sister
Yoon-Soo as Kang Yoo-Gyung, Il-Do's daughter

Kwon Family
Kim Ho-jin as Kwon Moo-Hyuk, Il-Joo's husband
Cho Yeon-woo as Kwon Joon-Hyuk, Moo-Hyuk's brother
Kim Chang-wan as Kwon Soo-Myung, Moo-Hyuk's father

Awards and nominations

References

External links 
 

2015 South Korean television series debuts
2015 South Korean television series endings
MBC TV television dramas
South Korean melodrama television series